Eurocamp is a British holiday company based in Cheshire that provides pre-sited outdoor holidays in Europe. The company works with third party partner campsites and holiday villages to offer beach, city and countryside holidays to approximately 180 parks in Europe, including in France, Italy, Spain, Portugal, the Netherlands, Austria, Switzerland, Germany, Luxembourg and Croatia.

As part of their holiday packages Eurocamp provide services such as kids' clubs.

History 
Founded in 1973 by Alan Goulding in Knutsford, Cheshire, Eurocamp Travel Ltd sold pre-sited tent holidays to a single campsite in Brittany.

In 1981, Goulding sold the family-run business to retail group Combined English Stores, which was bought by Next plc in 1987. Throughout the 1980s, Eurocamp added additional locations and introduced mobile home accommodation products.

In 1987, Eurocamp launched Eurocamp Independent, where vacationers bring their own camping equipment and motor homes but use other Eurocamp amenities.

Following a management buy-out in 1988, Eurocamp plc was floated on the London Stock Exchange in 1991.  In the mid-1990s, Eurocamp expanded through several acquisitions outside the camping holiday sector, including the 1995 merger with Superbreak. In 1998, Eurocamp plc acquired Keycamp Holidays and changed its name to Holidaybreak plc. By that time, competitors Sunsites and French Country Camping had also been acquired. Airtours' camping product Eurosites was purchased in 2002. By then, few competitors remained, Haven being the largest. In 2011, global travel company Cox & Kings bought Holidaybreak plc, with Eurocamp the main part of its camping division. In 2014, Eurocamp was purchased by Homair Vacances Group.

Holiday parks and resorts 
As of 2022, there were approximately 180 Eurocamp resorts located in Europe.

Austria 

 Salzburg: Sportcamp Woferlgut

 Styria: Bella Austria
 Tyrol: Natterer See

Croatia 

 Istria County: Brioni Sunny, Lanterna, Park Umag, Simuni
 Šibenik-Knin: Solaris Beach Resort
 Zadar County: Zaton Holiday Resort

France 

 Auvergne-Rhône-Alpes: Aluna Vacances, Le Pommier, Le Ranc Davaine, La Ravoire, Le Belledonne, Les Fontaines, Les Ranchisses

 Bourgogne-Franche-Comté: Domaine de Chalain, Le Val de Bonnal

 Brittany: Des Menhirs, Domaine des Ormes. L'Atlantique, La Baie, La Grande Métairie, Le Mané Guernehué, La Plage
 Centre-Val de Loire: Domaine de la Brèche, Le Parc de Fierbois
 Corsica: Marina d'Erba Rossa, Sole di Sari
 Hauts-de-France: La Croix du Vieux Pont
 Normandy: Château Lez Eaux, La Vallée
 Nouvelle-Aquitaine: Bel La Tranche-sur-Mer, Château de Fonrives, Château La Forêt, Cote D'Argent, Domaine d'Oléron, La Garangeoire, La Guyonnière, La Rive, Le Clarys Plage, Le Paradis, Le Pin Parasol, Le Ruisseau, Le Vieux Port, Le Village Western, Les Ecureuils, Oyam, Palmyre Loisirs, Pomport Beach, Saint Avit Loisirs, Sol a Gogo, Sylvamar
 Occitanie: Airotel Pyrénées, Aloha Village, Camping de la Plage, Club Farret, Club Le Napoleon, Criques de Porteils, Domaine de Massereau, Domaine de la Yole, Domaine Sainte Cécile, Hippocampe, La Chapelle, La Marina de Canet - Le Bosquet, La Sirène, Le Beach Garden, Le Bois de Valmarie, Le Brasilia, Le Front de Mer, Le Méditerranée Plage, Le Soleil de la Méditerranée,
 Picardie: Domaine de Drancourt, La Bien Assise Campsite
 Provence-Alpes-Côte d-Azur: Club Colombier, Domaine des Naiades, Esterel, Frejus, Holiday Marina Resort, La Baume, Les Lacs du Verdon, Les Prairies de la Mer

Germany 

 Lower Saxony: Südsee
 Baden-Württemberg: Campingplatz Herbolzheim
 Bavaria: Gitzenweiler Hof

Luxembourg 

 Mersch: Birkelt Village

Italy 

 Elba: Ville Degli Ulivi
 Emilia-Romagna: Adriano, Spiaggia E Mare, Vigna sul Mar
 Friuli Venezia Giulia: Marina Julia
 Lazio: Baia Domizia, Fabulous Village
 Lombardy: Eden Village, Weekend Village
 Sardinia: Bella Sardinia
 Tuscany: Le Pianacce, Montescudaio, Norcenni Girasole Club, Park Albatros, Valle Gaia
 Veneto: Altomincio Village, Bella Italia, Butterfly Village, Ca'Savio, Cisano, Del Garda Village, Garden Paradiso, Marina di Venezia, Portofelice, Pra delle Torri, Residence Village, Sant'Angelo Village, Serenella, Union Lido

The Netherlands 

 Friesland: Blaauw, T Hop
 Gelderland: De Twee Bruggen
 North Brabant: Beekse Bergen, Bospark 't Wolfsven, De Schatberg, TerSpegelt

 South Holland Duinrell, Koningshof
 Zeeland: Roompot Beach

Spain 

 Barcelona: El Garrofer, Vilanova Park
 Cantabria: Playa Joyel
 Girona: Caballo de Mar, Cala Gogo, Canyelles, Castell Montgri, La Masia, Tucan Village
 Tarragona: Cambrils Park, La Torre del Sol, Playa Bara, Playa Montroig, Sanguli

Switzerland 

 Interlaken: Manor Farm
 Lauterbrunnen: Jungfrau

International presence 
Eurocamp has sales operations in the UK, Ireland, the Netherlands, Belgium, Germany, Switzerland, Austria, Denmark and Poland.

References 

Travel and holiday companies of the United Kingdom
Hospitality companies established in 1973
Companies based in Cheshire
1973 establishments in England